The University of Minnesota Libraries is the library system of the University of Minnesota Twin Cities campus, operating at 12 facilities in and around Minneapolis–Saint Paul. It has over 8 million volumes and 119,000 serial titles that are collected, maintained and made accessible. The system is the 17th largest academic library in North America and the 20th largest library in the United States. While the system's primary mission is to serve faculty, staff and students, because the university is a public institution of higher education its libraries are also open to the public.

The Libraries hold a variety of notable, specialized and unusual collections. Examples include the world's largest assembly of materials on Sherlock Holmes and his creator Sir Arthur Conan Doyle; the Kerlan Collection of over 100,000 children's books; the Hess Collection, one of North America's largest collections of dime novels, story papers and pulp fiction; the James Ford Bell Library of rare maps, books and manuscripts, and the seventh largest law library in the United States, including over 1 million volumes and personal papers such as those of Clarence Darrow.

The system is a Federal Depository Library, a State of Minnesota Depository Library and United Nations Depository Library. Among research institutions, it maintains the second-largest collection of government documents in North America. The University of Minnesota was awarded the National Medal for Museum and Library Service in 2017.

Library buildings and collections

Minneapolis West Bank Campus
 Elmer L. Andersen Library
Charles Babbage Institute
Children's Literature Research Collection — includes the Kerlan Collection
Givens Collection of African American Literature
Immigration History Research Center Archives
James Ford Bell Library
Jean-Nickolaus Tretter Collection in Gay, Lesbian, Bisexual and Transgender Studies
Kautz Family YMCA Archives
Nathan and Theresa Berman Upper Midwest Jewish Archives (UMJA)
Northwest Architectural Archives
 Sherlock Holmes Collections
Social Welfare History Archives
Special Collections and Rare Books
University of Minnesota Archives
 Law Library, Law School
 Music Library, School of Music
 Wilson Library
Ames Library of South Asia
Business Reference Library
East Asian Library
Government Publications Library
John R. Borchert Map Library

Minneapolis East Bank Campus
 Architecture and Landscape Architecture Library, Rapson Hall
 Health Sciences Library, Phillips-Wangensteen Building
Wangensteen Historical Library of Biology and Medicine, Phillips-Wangensteen Building
 Eric Sevareid Journalism Library, Murphy Hall
 Mathematics Library, Vincent Hall
 Walter Library
Digital Technology Center
Science and Engineering Library

St. Paul Campus
 Magrath Library
Kirschner Collection
 Natural Resources Library, Hodson Hall

Off-Campus Locations
 Andersen Horticultural Library at the Minnesota Landscape Arboretum, Chanhassen, Minnesota

Services
The library system makes various services available to faculty, staff and students such as:
 Alumni and Visitor Services
 Copyright Consultation
 Instructor and Researcher Support
 Peer Research Consultants
 Scanning & Digitization Services

The system also offers services to citizens in Minnesota, North Dakota and South Dakota through MINITEX, a publicly funded program that supports academic, state government, public, school and specialized libraries in the region.

See also
 University of Minnesota Duluth
 University of Minnesota Morris

References

External links
University of Minnesota Libraries Main Page
University of Minnesota Law Library
University of Minnesota Special and Rare Books Collections

University of Minnesota
University and college academic libraries in the United States
Libraries in Minnesota